Hugh Young may refer to:

Hugh H. Young (1870–1945), American doctor
Hugh Andrew Young (1898–1982), Canadian military officer and politician
H. Edwin Young, American educator and Chancellor of UW-Madison
Hugh D. Young (1930-2013), American physicist